Trimble County High School is a Kentucky high school located on highway 421 in Bedford, Kentucky in Trimble County, Kentucky. Its current enrollment for the 2006–07 academic year is estimated at 504 students.

Sports
The school has won one state championship in any sport - for Cross Country in the 1950s - in its entire existence.

Notable alumni
Jack Tingle,  NCAA basketball player, NBA professional basketball player.

References

Public high schools in Kentucky
Schools in Trimble County, Kentucky